The 1953 Pacific hurricane season was the least active season on record. The season officially began on May 15 in the northeast Pacific Ocean and on June 1 in the central northern Pacific. They ended on November 30. These dates conventionally delimit the time of year when most tropical cyclones form in northeast Pacific Ocean. Before the satellite age started in the 1960s, data prior to that time on Pacific hurricanes is extremely unreliable as most east Pacific storms are of no threat to land.

Of the four known tropical systems, two became hurricanes. This season is unusual in that no one was killed, no damage was inflicted, and no tropical cyclones made landfall.

Seasonal summary
Only four known systems were observed during the 1953 season. This was below the average at that time, which was six. Furthermore, the season was well below the 1949-2006 average of 13 named storms and had the fewest storms in the hurricane database. Only two tropical cyclones reached hurricane status, compared to the modern-day average of seven. Furthermore, 1953 is also one of the few seasons without a major hurricane. This season was part of a decade-long absence of major hurricanes; from 1950–56, no major hurricanes (Category 3 or higher on the Saffir-Simpson Hurricane Wind Scale) were reported in the Eastern Pacific basin. However, it is possible that some storms were missed due to the lack of satellite coverage in the region in addition to the lack of Hurricane Hunter data, which did not become available until the following year.

The four known storms developed between the 14° N and  the 20° N. All of the storms remained at sea throughout their lifetime; no deaths nor damages were noted during the season, though moisture from two of them reached the Southwestern United States. The season got onto an extremely slow start. The first storm formed in late August. At that time, it was believed that two systems would have long formed by then on average. According to the modern-day National Hurricane Center, 8-10 storms would have by that time on average. Additionally, 1953 had the latest start date of any Pacific hurricane season on record. Additionally, 1953 is the only season in the database to have no storms by August. Throughout the 1953 hurricane season, the Weather Bureau office in Los Angeles (WBOLA) issued 42 advisories during the season, mostly due to the storms' threat to Southern California.

In addition to the four storms in the dataset, according to the Joint Typhoon Warning Center and Japan Meteorological Agency, on October 22 Tropical Storm Alice crossed the International Dateline, entering into CPHC's area of responsibility. The storm eventually became extratropical on October 23 over open waters.

Systems

Tropical Storm One

Thunderstorm activity off the Mexican coast was quite for the first half of August. Although the WBOLA reported that the storm dissipated that night near the peninsula, the HURDAT database suggests that the storm maintained peak intensity for another day, until August 27 when it dissipated.

The remnants of Tropical Storm One brought heavy rains to Arizona at the very end of the month.

Tropical Storm Two

Ships reports from the Hawaiian Islands to Panama indicated that an area of disturbed weather formed just west of the Revillagigedo island group. Initially, evidence of closed wind circulation was not sufficient enough to warrant an upgrade into a tropical disturbance. By the afternoon, pressures in the region began to fall. Maintaining peak intensity for a day, the low moved northwest before dissipating on September 10 as barometric pressures began to rise. The remnants of the storm later brought rain to Central California on September 15.

Hurricane Three

The storm held on to its wind speed, until September 17, when the storm dissipated. The remnants of the storm deluged the Mexican coast with rain, especially in Sinaloa.

Hurricane Four

On October 1, a closed low formed in the Gulf of Tehuantepec from an area of disturbed weather, which had persisted for several days prior. The hurricane dissipated on October 8 later after holding on to its maximum wind speed for six days before finally dissipating nowhere near land.

See also

List of Pacific hurricanes
Pacific hurricane season
1953 Atlantic hurricane season
1953 Pacific typhoon season
 Australian region cyclone seasons: 1952–53 1953–54
 South Pacific cyclone seasons: 1952–53 1953–54
 South-West Indian Ocean cyclone seasons: 1952–53 1953–54

References